Serge Sidoine Tchaha Leuko (born 4 August 1993) is a Cameroonian professional footballer who plays as a right or left back for Linense.

Club career
Born in Douala, Leuko joined RCD Mallorca's youth setup in 2008, through the Samuel Eto'o Foundation. After representing Atlètic de Ciutadella and CF Torre Levante, he moved to Valencia CF in 2011.

Leuko made his senior debut for the latter's reserves in the 2012–13 campaign, in Segunda División B. On 17 July 2015 he signed a three-year contract with CD Lugo in Segunda División, but was loaned to third-tier club UD Somozas on 10 August, for one year.

Leuko made his professional debut on 21 August 2016, coming on as a late substitute for Igor Martínez in a 2–2 away draw against Gimnàstic de Tarragona. Initially a backup to Jordi Calavera as a right back, he overtook veteran Manu on the left side in December, becoming a first choice afterwards.

On 17 September 2020, Leuko agreed to a one-year deal with Belgian First Division A side Waasland-Beveren.

International career
After playing for Cameroon at under-20 level, Leuko was first called by the full side on 12 March 2017 for two friendlies against Tunisia and Guinea. He made his full international debut sixteen days later, starting in 1–2 to the latter.

References

External links

Stats and bio at Ciberche 

1993 births
Living people
Footballers from Douala
Cameroonian footballers
Association football defenders
Segunda División players
Segunda División B players
Belgian Pro League players
Valencia CF Mestalla footballers
CD Lugo players
UD Somozas players
S.K. Beveren players
Cameroon international footballers
Cameroonian expatriate footballers
Cameroonian expatriate sportspeople in Spain
Cameroonian expatriate sportspeople in Belgium
Expatriate footballers in Spain
Expatriate footballers in Belgium